The finals and the qualifying heats of the Men's 200 metres Butterfly event at the 1997 FINA Short Course World Championships were held on the third day of the competition, on Saturday 19 April 1997 in Gothenburg, Sweden.

Finals

Qualifying heats

Remarks

See also
1996 Men's Olympic Games 200m Butterfly
1997 Men's European LC Championships 200m Butterfly

References
 Results

B